James Denis Denegre (May 5, 1868 – December 30, 1926) was an American lawyer and politician.

Denegre was born in New Orleans, Louisiana. He graduated from Phillips Exeter Academy in 1885 and from Princeton University in 1889. He received his law degree from University of Minnesota Law School in 1889. Denegre was admitted to the Minnesota bar. He lived with his wife and family in Saint Paul, Minnesota, and practiced law in Saint Paul, Minnesota. Denegre served in the Minnesota Senate from 1911 until his death in 1926. He was a Republican.

References

1868 births
1926 deaths
Lawyers from New Orleans
Politicians from New Orleans
Minnesota lawyers
Politicians from Saint Paul, Minnesota
Phillips Exeter Academy alumni
Princeton University alumni
University of Minnesota Law School alumni
Republican Party Minnesota state senators